Listen Against is a BBC Radio 4 series. Its title is a play on the name of the BBC's Listen Again service. Presented by Jon Holmes and Alice Arnold, it takes a surreal look at the week's radio.

Created by Jon Holmes, it is co-written by Bill Dare, Joel Morris and Jason Hazeley, Carl Carter and Tony Cooke, Gareth Gwynn, Matt Charlton, and Adam Buxton.

Air dates

Series 1 
 Episode 1 - 2007-11-14
 Episode 2 - 2007-11-21
 Episode 3 - 2007-11-28
 Episode 4 - 2007-12-05

Series 2 
 Episode 1 - 2008-11-18
 Episode 2 - 2008-11-25
 Episode 3 - 2008-12-02
 Episode 4 - 2008-12-09

Series 3 
 Episode 1 - 2010-09-07
 Episode 2 - 2010-09-14
 Episode 3 - 2010-09-21
 Episode 4 - 2010-09-28

Series 4 
 Episode 1 - 2011-11-03
 Episode 2 - 2011-11-10
 Episode 3 - 2011-11-17
 Episode 4 - 2011-11-24

External links
Radio 4 - Listen Against official homepage
Radio 4 - Listen Against series 3 page at the BBC
British Comedy Guide

References

BBC Radio comedy programmes
Satirical radio programmes
2007 radio programme debuts
British satirical radio programmes
BBC Radio 4 programmes